Trematosteus is an extinct monospecific genus of arthrodire placoderm from the Late Frasnian stage of the Late Devonian period. Fossils are found from Bad Wildungen, Germany.

Phylogeny
Trematosteus is a member of the superfamily Incisoscutoidea, which belongs to the clade Coccosteomorphi, one of the two major clades within Eubrachythoraci. The cladogram below shows the phylogeny of Trematosteus:

References 

Arthrodires